Jordi Warlop (born 4 June 1996 in Diksmuide) is a Belgian cyclist, who currently rides for UCI Continental team .

Major results

2014
 2nd Road race, UEC European Junior Road Championships
 3rd Overall Keizer der Juniores
2015
 9th Piccolo Giro di Lombardia
2016
 9th Eschborn–Frankfurt Under–23
 10th Grand Prix Criquielion
2017
 3rd Paris–Roubaix Espoirs
 5th Piccolo Giro di Lombardia
 7th Grote Prijs Stad Sint-Niklaas
 10th Omloop Het Nieuwsblad U23
2018
 7th Trofeo Palma
2019
 8th Gooikse Pijl
 10th Ronde van Limburg
2021
 7th Grote Prijs Jean-Pierre Monseré
 8th Grote Prijs Marcel Kint
 9th Elfstedenronde
2022
 10th Veenendaal–Veenendaal
2023
 2nd Muscat Classic

References

External links

1996 births
Living people
Belgian male cyclists
People from Diksmuide
Cyclists from West Flanders
21st-century Belgian people